Republic v. Bynum, Dallam 376 (1844), was a case decided by the Supreme Court of the Republic of Texas which held that uncertainty in the description of the offense charged in the indictment requires that the person be discharged from custody.  The Court issued a writ of habeas corpus to order the release of the prisoner.

Background 
William D. Bynum was convicted of an offense and confined, and requested a writ of habeas corpus.

Decision 
Judge William J. Jones stated that the indictment charged "or other articles of value" did not sufficiently describe a criminal offense.  It is not listed as an offense under either the common law or the statutes of the Republic.  He then stated that the rules of construction (describing the rule of lenity) required that these matters be determined in favor of the accused, and issued the writ to discharge Bynum from custody.

References 

Republic of Texas law
1844 in case law
1844 in the Republic of Texas